Vancouver Kingsway is a federal electoral district in British Columbia, Canada, that has been represented in the House of Commons of Canada from 1953 to 1988 and since 1997. It is located in Vancouver.

Demographics
This riding's population is over 54 percent immigrants. The three largest pan-ethnic groups include East Asians (35.5 percent), Europeans (27.6 percent) and Southeast Asians (19.4 percent). The service sector, retail trade and manufacturing are the major sources of employment in Vancouver Kingsway. The average family income is over $72,000. Unemployment is around 6.5 percent.

9.9 percent of the population is Buddhist, the highest in Canada. More generally, Vancouver Kingsway has the highest proportion of non-Christians, 62.8 percent in particular, of which: no religious affiliation: 43.5 percent, Buddhist: 9.9 percent, Sikh: 3.2 percent etc.

History
The name "Vancouver Kingsway" has been used twice to describe federal ridings. It was first created in 1952, carved out of Vancouver South riding. In 1987, the riding was divided between Burnaby—Kingsway, Vancouver East, Vancouver Quadra and Vancouver South ridings. In 1996, a new Vancouver Kingsway was created out of these same four ridings.

This riding has been held by the NDP and its precursor CCF for most of its history. The NDP (along with the CCF) has won 15 of the 21 elections held since the riding was formed in 1953, the Liberals have won five, and the Conservatives, one. The two candidates who topped the poll in the 2008 election ran again in 2011. The incumbent member of Parliament, Vancouver lawyer Don Davies, represented the NDP, and Vancouver businesswoman Wendy Yuan represented the Liberal Party again. Davies won by approximately 3,000 votes in 2008. In 2011, Davies quintupled that margin, topping the Liberal candidate by over 15,000 votes, the Conservative candidate by over 10,000 votes, and winning over 50 percent of the votes cast.

The 2012 federal electoral boundaries redistribution concluded that the electoral boundaries of Vancouver Kingsway should be adjusted, and a modified electoral district of the same name was created. The redefined Vancouver Kingsway lost its territory west of Main Street to the new district of Vancouver Granville, as well as a small area in its extreme southeast to Vancouver South. These new boundaries were legally defined in the 2013 representation order, which came into effect upon the call of the 2015 election.

David Emerson controversy
David Emerson was first elected in 2004, for the Liberal Party of Canada, and served in the Cabinet as the Minister of Industry.

Emerson was re-elected as a Liberal in the 2006 election, but crossed the floor two weeks later on February 6, 2006, to become the new Minister of International Trade in Stephen Harper's Conservative government.

Emerson's floor-crossing was highly controversial. Then Prime Minister-designate Stephen Harper dispatched campaign co-chair John Douglas Reynolds, on the day after the election, to offer Emerson a cabinet post in a Conservative government. Emerson's acceptance of that offer made Canadian history, marking the first time a member of parliament, let alone a cabinet minister, had crossed the floor before a new government was even sworn in.

As a result of the controversy, a number of groups formed to fight for Emerson's resignation. Some groups also seek legislation that would prevent floor crossing altogether or restrict a member of parliament if they abandon their party's caucus. Groups that fought against Emerson's defection included the New Democratic Party-aligned Recall David Emerson Campaign, and the Liberal Party-aligned but eventually wholly citizen-driven De-Elect Emerson Campaign.

Members of Parliament

This riding has elected the following members of Parliament:

Election results

1997–present

1953–1988

See also
 List of Canadian federal electoral districts
 Past Canadian electoral districts

Notes

Citations

References

 Expenditures – 2004
 Expenditures – 2000
 Expenditures – 1997

External links
 Website of the Parliament of Canada

Politics of Vancouver
British Columbia federal electoral districts
Federal electoral districts in Greater Vancouver and the Fraser Valley